Renato Gardini (10 March 1889 – 29 September 1940) was a Greco-Roman wrestler from Italy. He competed in the 1912 Olympics, but lost in the fourth bout to Anders Ahlgren. After the Olympics he immigrated to the United States, where he competed professionally, and got married in 1922. He spent much time promoting wrestling in South America, where he died in 1940.

References

External links
 

1889 births
1940 deaths
Olympic wrestlers of Italy
Wrestlers at the 1912 Summer Olympics
Italian male sport wrestlers
Sportspeople from Bologna
Road incident deaths in Argentina